is a multi-use complex in Nara, Japan. It opened in 1999 as part of the centennial celebrations of the  municipality of Nara. There is a large hall that seats up to 1720, a smaller concert hall with a capacity of 446, and a gallery. Arata Isozaki was the architect, with acoustical design by Nagata Acoustics.

See also

 Historic Monuments of Ancient Nara

References

External links
  Homepage

Concert halls in Japan
Buildings and structures in Nara, Nara
Tourist attractions in Nara Prefecture
1999 establishments in Japan
Music venues completed in 1998
Arata Isozaki buildings